Khadidiatou Diallo, born in Senegal, is the founder of the Groupe de femmes pour l'Abolition des Mutilations Sexuelles (GAMS) in Belgium.

Biography 
Khadidiatou Diallo underwent excision at the age of seven. At 12 she was married without her consent to a man 33 years her senior.

She arrived in Belgium in the 1980s. At 24, she learned how to read and write, and began writing her life story. Writing was an emotional outlet for her to help overcome her traumatic past. 

To fight against excision and female genital mutilation, Khadidiatou Diallo founded the Groupe de femmes pour l'Abolition des Mutilations Sexuelles (GAMS) in 1966.

Awards 
In 2005, she was awarded the "Prix femme de l'année Marie Popelin" from the Conseil des femmes francophones de Belgique

Publications 
 Khadidiatou Diallo, Mon destin entre les mains de mon père, Bruxels, Ed. Collectif Alpha, 2016

Notes and references

External links 
GAMS in Belgium

Senegalese feminists
Activists against female genital mutilation
Living people
Year of birth missing (living people)
Senegalese health activists
Violence against women in Senegal